Epoicocladius is a genus of non-biting midges in the subfamily Orthocladiinae of the bloodworm family Chironomidae. There is one known species.

Species
E. ephemerae (Kieffer in Sulc & ZavÍel, 1924)

Chironomidae